Wallenpaupack Area School District is a third-class school district in Pike and Wayne Counties in Pennsylvania. The district's population was 24,729 at the time of the 2010 United States Census.

According to federal census data, its population has increased by 3,991 residents from 20,738 residents in 2000. In 2009, the district residents’ per capita income was $19,073, while the median family income was $42,955. In the Commonwealth, the median family income was $49,501 and the United States median family income was $49,445, in 2010.

The school district operates six schools
Wallenpaupack Area South Elementary,  Newfoundland, PA (grades K-5)
Wallenpaupack Area North Elementary, Hawley, PA (grades 3-5)
Wallenpaupack Hawley Center, Hawley, PA (HeadStart)
Wallenpaupack Area Middle School, Hawley, PA (grades 6-8)
Wallenpaupack Area High School, Hawley, PA (grades 9-12)
Wallenpaupack Primary School (grades K-2)

Constituent municipalities
Unlike many school districts in Pennsylvania, Wallenpaupack Area is not subdivided into regions. However, it does contain the following municipalities (labeled by county):
Blooming Grove Township (Pike)
Dreher Township (Wayne)
Greene Township (Pike)
Hawley Borough (Wayne)
Lackawaxen Township (Pike)
Palmyra Township (Pike)
Palmyra Township (Wayne)
Paupack Township (Wayne)
Texas Township (Wayne) (partially in the Wayne Highlands School District)

References

External links
Wallenpaupack Area School District

School districts in Wayne County, Pennsylvania
School districts in Pike County, Pennsylvania